Danielle Antoinette Crockrom (born February 11, 1981) is a former professional women's basketball player for the WNBA. She was the eleventh pick in the 2002 WNBA Draft. She played forward for the Utah Starzz.

Baylor  statistics
Source

WNBA season statistics

References

1981 births
Living people
American women's basketball players
Basketball players from Houston
Baylor Bears women's basketball players
Forwards (basketball)
Utah Starzz draft picks
Utah Starzz players